Sir Hugh Smithson, 4th Baronet was an English landowner.

Hugh Smithson may also refer to:

Sir Hugh Smithson, 1st Baronet of the Smithson baronets
Sir Hugh Smithson, 3rd Baronet of the Smithson baronets

See also
Smithson (surname)